Pleurosoma is a genus in the moth subfamily Arctiinae described by Orfila in 1935.

Species
Pleurosoma angustata (Möschler, 1878) Guatemala, Panama, Suriname and Venezuela.
Pleurosoma perconstrictum (Zerny, 1912) Brazil

References

Arctiinae
Monotypic moth genera